In science, and most specifically chemistry, the accepted value denotes a value of a substance accepted by almost all scientists and the experimental value denotes the value of a substance's properties found in a localized lab.

See also
Accuracy and precision
Error
Approximation error

References 

Analytical chemistry